The Scheffel was the German bushel.

Scheffel is also used as a German surname. Notable people include:

David Scheffel, Canadian anthropologist
Johan Henrik Scheffel (1690-1781), Swedish artist
Joseph Viktor von Scheffel (1826–1886), German poet and novelist
Mark Scheffel (born 1959), American politician
Michael Scheffel (born 1958), professor for the history of modern German literature
Rudolf Scheffel (1915–1983), German Luftwaffe ace
Tom Scheffel (born 1994), German footballer

See also 

Scheffel Hall, Manhattan, New York City
Scheffler

German-language surnames